José Planas Artés (14 April 1901 – 9 April 1977) was a Spanish football player and manager.

Career
Born in Barcelona, Planas began his playing career with local side L'Avenç del Sport. He played for Barcelona from 1921 to 1927, where he would make 184 official appearances and win the 1922, 1925, and 1926 Copa del Rey, until he suffered a knee injury that ended his playing career.

As a manager, he took charge of Racing de Ferrol, Arenas Club, Real Murcia, Celta de Vigo, Deportivo La Coruña, Real Zaragoza, Barcelona, Real Valladolid, Espanyol, San Andrés, Tenerife, UD Mahón and Sabadell.

References

External links

1901 births
1977 deaths
Footballers from Barcelona
Spanish footballers
Association football defenders
Segunda División players
UE Sant Andreu footballers
FC Barcelona players
Real Murcia players
Spanish football managers
La Liga managers
Segunda División managers
Tercera División managers
Arenas Club de Getxo managers
Real Murcia managers
RC Celta de Vigo managers
Racing de Ferrol managers
Deportivo de La Coruña managers
Real Zaragoza managers
FC Barcelona managers
Real Valladolid managers
RCD Espanyol managers
CF Reus Deportiu managers
UE Sant Andreu managers
CD Tenerife managers
CE Sabadell FC managers
Ecuador national football team managers
Spanish expatriate football managers
Spanish expatriate sportspeople in Ecuador
Expatriate football managers in Ecuador